Cobb is an unincorporated community in Stoddard County, in the U.S. state of Missouri.

Variant names were "Cobbs" and "Cobbs Station". The community has the name of N. M. Cobbs, a businessman in the local lumber industry.

References

Unincorporated communities in Stoddard County, Missouri
Unincorporated communities in Missouri